The 2001 Heineken Open Shanghai was a men's tennis tournament played on outdoor hard courts in Shanghai, China and was part of the International Series of the 2001 ATP Tour. It was the sixth edition of the tournament and ran from 17 September through 23 September 2001. Second-seeded Rainer Schüttler won the singles title.

Finals

Singles

 Rainer Schüttler defeated  Michel Kratochvil 6–3, 6–4
 It was Schüttler's only singles title of the year and the 2nd of his career.

Doubles

 Byron Black /  Thomas Shimada defeated  John-Laffnie de Jager /  Robbie Koenig 6–2, 3–6, 7–5
 It was Black's 2nd title of the year and the 24th of his career. It was Shimada's only title of the year and the 1st of his career.

References

External links
 ITF tournament edition details

Heineken Open Shanghai
Kingfisher Airlines Tennis Open